Transnistria is a region in Eastern Europe that is under the effective control of the self-declared Pridnestrovian Moldavian Republic but is recognized by the international community as an administrative unit of Moldova, the Administrative-Territorial Units of the Left Bank of the Dniester. 

The Pridnestrovian Moldavian Republic uses a coat of arms based on the arms of the former Moldavian Soviet Socialist Republic and the Administrative-Territorial Units of the Left Bank of the Dniester use the coat of arms of Moldova.

Pridnestrovian Moldavian Republic

The coat of arms of the Pridnestrovian Moldavian Republic constitutes a remodeled version of the former Moldavian Soviet Socialist Republic's emblem, which was replaced by the internationally recognized Moldovan government after the dissolution of the Soviet Union in 1991. The only major pictorial change made in the Transnistrian version involves the addition of waves, representing the River Dniester. However, the inscriptions on the banner were changed: unlike the Moldavian SSR emblem, which bore the acronym РССМ (for "Moldavian Soviet Socialist Republic") and the USSR state slogan "Workers of the world, unite!" in the Russian and Romanian languages, the Transnistrian emblem bears the name PRIDNESTROVIAN MOLDAVIAN REPUBLIC in the Romanian, Russian and Ukrainian languages. 

 In Russian, it reads "" (transliterated as ) to the left;
 In Moldovan Cyrillic, it reads "" (transliterated as ) in the middle;
 In Ukrainian, it reads "" (transliterated as ) to the right.

Despite the emblem's depiction of the hammer and sickle, Transnistria is not a socialist state.

Administrative-Territorial Units of the Left Bank of the Dniester 
The law which formally established the Administrative-Territorial Units of the Left Bank of the Dniester contains provisions for the region to adopt its own symbols. The region has not currently adopted a distinctive emblem and instead uses the Coat of arms of Moldova for official purposes.

Historical symbols

See also 
 Flag of Transnistria
 Emblem of the Moldavian Soviet Socialist Republic
 Coat of arms of Moldova
 Coat of arms of Tiraspol
 Coat of arms of Gagauzia

References

External links
 
 Coat of arms of Transnistria

Politics of Transnistria
Transnistria
Transnistria
Transnistria
Transnistria
Transnistria
Transnistria
Transnistria
Transnistria
Transnistria
Transnistria
Transnistria